Ropati is a Polynesian name, and may refer to the following:
Ropati Pitoitua (born 1985), American football player
Le Mamea Ropati, Samoan politician
Tea Ropati (born 1964), New Zealand former professional rugby league footballer
Jerome Ropati (born 1984), New Zealand rugby league player
Joe Ropati, New Zealand rugby league player
Tangi Ropati (born 1984), New Zealand rugby league player
Romi Ropati (born 1976), New Zealand rugby union player
Iva Ropati, former professional rugby league footballer
Peter Ropati, New Zealand rugby league player and commentator